Meli Tuni (born 19 June 2000) is a Fijian rugby union player, currently playing for the . His preferred position is prop.

Professional career
Tuni was named in the Fijian Drua squad for the 2022 Super Rugby Pacific season.

References

External links
itsrugby.co.uk Profile

2000 births
Living people
Fijian rugby union players
Rugby union props
Fijian Drua players